Sir Nigel Gresley Ball, 3rd Baronet (27 August 1892 – July 1978) was Professor of Botany at Ceylon University College, Sri Lanka, (1924-1943).

Background and family
Ball was the younger son of Sir Charles Bent Ball and his wife Annie Julia Kinahan.

On 28 December 1922, he married Florine Isabel Irwin, the daughter of Colonel Herbert Edwardes Irwin.

Education
He was educated at Trinity College, Dublin, graduating BA, DSc and later MA.

Career
He served with the Royal Dublin Fusiliers and was promoted Captain.

He was Professor of Botany between 1924 and 1943 at University College, Colombo, then moved to King's College London, where he was lecturer in Botany (1944-1955), Reader in Botany (1955-1957), and Special Reader in Botany (1957-1959).

Title
On 21 December 1945, Ball succeeded his brother as a baronet (3rd UK Baronet Ball, of Merion Square, Dublin and Killybegs, County Donegal, created 1911).

References 
Sir Nigel Gresley Ball at ThePeerage.com

1892 births
1978 deaths
Baronets in the Baronetage of the United Kingdom
Alumni of Trinity College Dublin
Academic staff of the Ceylon University College
Royal Dublin Fusiliers officers
Academics of King's College London
British Army personnel of World War I
People from British Ceylon
Military personnel from Dublin (city)